Dragonwyck is a novel written by American author Anya Seton which was first published in 1944. It is a fictional story of the life of Miranda Wells and her abusive marriage to Nicholas Van Ryn, set against a historical background of the Patroon system, Anti-Rent Wars, the Astor Place Riots, and steamboat racing on the Hudson River. 

The novel was adapted into the film Dragonwyck directed by Joseph L. Mankiewicz and starring Gene Tierney, Walter Huston, Vincent Price, and Glenn Langan.

Plot summary
The story begins in May 1844 with Miranda Wells, the daughter of a humble farmer in Greenwich, Connecticut. Abigail, Miranda's mother, receives a letter from Nicholas Van Ryn who is Abigail's maternal half first cousin and Patroon of a large manor called Dragonwyck near Hudson, New York. In the letter Van Ryn invites one of the Wells girls to Dragonwyck, to act as company for his six year old daughter Katrine. After initial doubts, Miranda's parents allow her to go to Dragonwyck where she is instantly attracted to and intrigued by the rich, mysterious and very dashing Nicholas, falling head over heels.

Not everyone welcomes Miranda to Dragonwyck. Nicholas' corpulent and lazy wife, Johanna, sees Miranda as a threat, and tries to keep her from her husband. Soon, Miranda encounters kind Doctor Jeff(erson) Turner, a skilled physician and a passionate anti-renter who believes that rich Patroons, like the Van Ryns, should give up their large estates. Van Ryn and Turner instantly dislike each other, and because of his views, Miranda is baffled when Nicholas asks the doctor to attend to his wife, who has a cold. However, while Dr. Turner is at Dragonwyck, Johanna becomes violently ill and dies. As Dr. Turner leaves, wondering what caused such a sudden death, Nicholas asks Miranda to marry him. She accepts.

Married life to Nicholas Van Ryn is far from what Miranda imagined. Despite him brutally forcing himself on her on their wedding night, she finds herself making excuses for him and staying by his side loyally but foolishly. As the story moves on, Nicholas's true mental state and his egotistical thirst for power become evident. After their newborn son dies, the relationship between Miranda and her now opium addicted husband withers, and the bonds between Miranda and Dr. Turner strengthen. Although the marriage then enters a potentially promising phase, this proves to be short-lived. Miranda's suspicions are aroused by Johanna's secret diary found in the attic and Dr. Turner eventually confirms to Miranda that Nicholas poisoned his frightened first wife with oleander resembling nutmeg on a cake. They confront him, then plan to escape, but Nicholas catches up with Miranda on a steamboat traveling down the Hudson River. The steamboat gets caught up in a race, catches fire, and crashes. Miranda is rescued by Nicholas, but he dies having rescued other passengers from the steamboat. After the ordeal, Miranda and Dr. Turner marry and plan to leave the Hudson Valley area forever, for a new life in California.

Reception 
Kirkus Reviews called it "early 19th century decor for a good story -- a holding drama and colorful".

Editions 
Philippa Gregory wrote the foreword to the 2005 edition.

Hillary Huber and Bonnie Hurren narrate audiobook adaptations.

See also
 Manor of Rensselaerswyck, the historic patroonship in the Hudson River Valley of New York where Dragonwyck is placed.

References 

1944 American novels
Novels by Anya Seton
American historical novels
American novels adapted into films
Fictional houses
Hudson River
Novels set in New York (state)
Houghton Mifflin books